The 2020 Big Ten Football Championship Game was a college football game played on December 19, 2020 at Lucas Oil Stadium in Indianapolis, Indiana. The tenth annual Big Ten Football Championship Game, it determined the 2020 champion of the Big Ten Conference. The game was played between the No. 4 Ohio State Buckeyes out of the East division, and the No. 14 Northwestern Wildcats out of the West division. Sponsored by credit card company Discover, the game was officially known as the Big Ten Championship Game presented by Discover.

History
The 2020 Championship Game was the tenth in the Big Ten's 125-year history and the seventh to feature the conference's East and West alignment. East division champion Ohio State won the 2019 game over West division champion Wisconsin by a score of 34–21.

Teams
Ohio State and Northwestern faced each other in the Big Ten Championship Game for the second time. Ohio State won the first championship game between the two schools, in 2018.

Northwestern

Northwestern booked their place in the Championship Game by winning the West Division with a record of 6–1 (6–1 Big Ten). The Wildcats are making their second appearance in the Championship Game, with the only previous appearance coming in 2018 against Ohio State. The Wildcats are ranked 14th in the College Football Playoff rankings heading into the game.

Ohio State

Ohio State secured their place in the Championship Game by winning the East Division with an undefeated 5–0 (5–0 Big Ten) regular season record. This will be Ohio State's sixth appearance in the Championship Game, and fourth consecutive. They are the three-time reigning conference champions. The Buckeyes are ranked fourth in the College Football Playoff rankings heading into the game.

Originally, Ohio State would not have qualified to play in the championship game due to the Big Ten's six-game minimum rule that was adopted in light of the COVID-19 pandemic, but that rule was eliminated shortly after Ohio State's final game, against Michigan, was canceled. This allowed the Buckeyes to advance to the Championship game at 5–0 over Big Ten East runners-up Indiana, who finished 6–1.

Game summary

Statistics

See also
List of Big Ten Conference football champions

Notes

References

External links
Game statistics at statbroadcast.com

Championship
Big Ten Football Championship Game
Northwestern Wildcats football games
Ohio State Buckeyes football games
Big Ten Football Championship Game
Big Ten Football Champ
2020s in Indianapolis